The 9 cm mortar Type GR (German-Russian) was a World War I Russian mortar, developed circa 1915. It was a variant of captured Austro-Hungarian mortars 9 cm Minenwerfer M 14. 12,519 9 cm GR mortars were produced in 1915-1917 in Russia.
Its shell is comparable in power to the modern 81 mm mortar shell.

Comparison of Russian Front mortars (1915—1917)

References

External links 

http://s51.radikal.ru/i131/0810/3d/84794d10a32c.jpg
http://ww1.milua.org/9minGR.htm

Infantry mortars
World War I mortars of Russia
90 mm artillery